Carl Alan Mark Florman (born 2 November 1958) is a British businessman and entrepreneur. He is a co-founder and former CEO of the merchant banking group, Maizels, Westerberg & Co. and Time Partners Limited. Florman led the review of governance for UK public bodies in 2021.

Professional background

In 1992, Florman was co-founder and later CEO of Maizels, Westerberg & Co.

In 2009, Florman co-founded 8Miles, an African private equity firm, with Bob Geldof and Kofi Annan.

In 2013, Mark Florman co-founded the investment and corporate advisory firm Time Partners. A stated aim of the company is to create a virtuous circle between the way in which a company is run, its ability to attract capital and its service to the broader community.

On 20 March 2015, Mark Florman was appointed to the BBC Trust. Florman's term began on 1 April 2015 and ended in April 2017.

In 2018, he was appointed as a non-executive director of the Home Office.

In 2021, he became Chair of the Sovereign Wealth Fund of Mauritius, the Mauritius Investment Corporation (MIC).

The External Rate of Return 

In February 2016, Mark Florman in conjunction with Dr Robyn Klingler-Vidra, King's College London and LSE Enterprise with Mr Martim Jacinto Facada; created the External Rate of Return (ERR), an inclusive, transparency index for measuring the overall impact of business activities upon the economy and society in general.

Philanthropic activities
Florman co-founded the UK social justice and poverty think tank Centre for Social Justice in 2004 alongside Iain Duncan Smith, Tim Montgomerie and Philippa Stroud.

He is life Ambassador to the Centre for Social Justice and Build Africa.

Academic Relationships 
Florman is a Distinguished Fellow at INSEAD Global Private Equity Initiative, a Visiting Senior Fellow at the London School of Economics and a Visiting Professor at the Policy Institute King's College London.

Political work
According to the Register of Members' Interests Florman donated £2,500 to Boris Johnson (Registered 23 December 2019).

References

External links
Official website

English businesspeople
Living people
1958 births
English people of Swedish descent
Conservative Party (UK) donors